Viktor Mikhailovich Adamishin (25 March 1962 – 7 April 1995) was a Russian militia captain. In 1995 he was killed during a military operation in the Chechen village of Samashki, and was awarded posthumously the title Hero of the Russian Federation on August 25, 1995.

During a military operation in Samashki, Adamishin's unit was surrounded by militants and pinned down by heavy fire. During the fighting, Adamishin's squad became surrounded and formed a defensive circle. Viktor decided to organize a breakthrough for his unit and remained behind to provide covering fire. Adamishin was mortally wounded during the skirmish and died on the battlefield.

Adamishin was posthumously awarded the Russian Order of Courage in 1995.

Sources and references

External links
Biography on warheroes.ru (in Russian)
With all available means..., report of human rights organization about Samashki operation (in Russian)

Heroes of the Russian Federation
Recipients of the Order "For Personal Courage"
People of the Chechen wars
1962 births
1995 deaths
People from Murmansk
Russian military personnel killed in action